Francesca von Strassoldo Grafenberg was a Countess of Carniola Slovenia. She was born January 3, 1781, in  Tržič. 

In 1798, she married the Bohemian nobleman and Austrian field marshal Joseph Radetzky von Radetz. The couple lived together on the former estate of Francesca's mother until 1819. They had five sons and three daughters. 

She died on January 12, 1854.

References

1781 births
1854 deaths
18th-century Carniolan people
19th-century Carniolan people
People from Tržič